The 1913 Dayton St. Mary's Cadets season was their first season in existence, as a player in the unofficial Ohio League. It was the first season for a team that would ultimately go on to become the Indianapolis Colts The team finished with a 7–0 record.

Schedule

Game notes

References
Pro Football Archives: Dayton St. Mary's Cadets 1913

Dayton Triangles seasons
Dayton Tri
Dayton Tri